Kabgivan (also Romanized as Kabgīvan) is a village in Chenar Rural District, Kabgian District, Dana County, Kohgiluyeh and Boyer-Ahmad Province, Iran. At the 2006 census, its population was 278, in 62 families.

References 

Populated places in Dana County